Kwame Obeng Darko (born March 26, 1986) is a Ghanaian former footballer.

Early career
The Ghanaian born Darko began his career with 11 stoppers (u-12) then joined Fotofas Colts club (u-17).

Career
Darko played two years with Liberty Professionals F.C. before signing for Asante Kotoko. He played now for two months for Asante Kotoko and signed on 15 February 2009 for Syrian club Al-Karamah. He was in summer 2009 released by the Syrian club Al-Karamah and turned back to Ghana who signed for Power FC. The striker left his club Power FC in September 2010 and signed with Liberty Professionals F.C.

Personal life
Darko is the son of Hayford Darko and Margaret Bediako and is the second of four children.

References

1986 births
Living people
Ghanaian footballers
Association football forwards
Liberty Professionals F.C. players
Asante Kotoko S.C. players
Al-Karamah players
Power F.C. players
Ghanaian expatriate footballers
Expatriate footballers in Israel
Expatriate footballers in Syria
Syrian Premier League players